Pulaski County is a county located in the U.S. state of Missouri. As of the 2010 census, the population was 52,274. Its county seat is Waynesville. The county was organized in 1833 and named for Kazimierz Pułaski, a Polish patriot who died fighting in the American Revolution.

Pulaski County is the site of Fort Leonard Wood, a U.S. Army training base. It comprises the Fort Leonard Wood, MO Micropolitan Statistical Area which has nearly one-third of the total county population.

History
Pulaski County's earliest settlers were the Quapaw, Missouria and Osage Native Americans. After the Lewis and Clark Expedition of the early 19th century, white settlers came to the area, many from Kentucky, Tennessee and the Carolinas; the earliest pioneers appeared to have settled as early as 1818, and the town of Waynesville was designated the county seat by the Missouri Legislature in 1833. Like the county, Waynesville is also named after an American Revolutionary hero, Mad Anthony Wayne.

Geography

Adjacent counties
Miller County (northwest)
Maries County (northeast)
Phelps County (east)
Texas County (south)
Laclede County (southwest)
Camden County (west)

National protected area
Mark Twain National Forest (part)

Demographics

As of the census of 2000, there were 41,165 people, 13,433 households, and 9,953 families residing in the county. The population density was 75 people per square mile (29/km2). There were 15,408 housing units at an average density of 28 per square mile (11/km2). The racial makeup of the county was 78.35% White, 11.99% Black or African American, 1.00% Native American, 2.27% Asian, 0.32% Pacific Islander, 2.50% from other races, and 3.57% from two or more races. Approximately 5.84% of the population were Hispanic or Latino of any race.

There were 13,433 households, out of which 42.30% had children under the age of 18 living with them, 60.60% were married couples living together, 9.70% had a female householder with no husband present, and 25.90% were non-families. 21.60% of all households were made up of individuals, and 7.20% had someone living alone who was 65 years of age or older. The average household size was 2.68 and the average family size was 3.13.

In the county, the population was spread out, with 27.50% under the age of 18, 16.60% from 18 to 24, 32.00% from 25 to 44, 15.90% from 45 to 64, and 7.90% who were 65 years of age or older. The median age was 28 years. For every 100 females there were 112.10 males. For every 100 females age 18 and over, there were 115.40 males.

The median income for a household in the county was $34,247, and the median income for a family was $37,786. Males had a median income of $26,553 versus $20,500 for females. The per capita income for the county was $14,586. About 8.00% of families and 10.30% of the population were below the poverty line, including 12.40% of those under age 18 and 12.30% of those age 65 or over.

2020 Census

Transportation

Airport
Waynesville Regional Airport at Forney Field serves the community with air service; even though it's on Fort Leonard Wood, it is jointly run by the cities of Waynesville and St. Robert and is available for civilian use by private pilots and scheduled commercial passenger service.
The City of Richland also has an "Unmanned" Airport that consists of a 3000 ft runway.

Major highways
The major east–west route is  Interstate 44; before that, the main highway was  U.S. Route 66, which still exists as a scenic route through the area and passes through Devil's Elbow, St. Robert, Waynesville, Buckhorn, and Hazelgreen. Names for U.S. Route 66 vary - at different places, it's called Teardrop Road, Highway Z, Old Route 66, Historic Route 66, and Highway 17. State-posted signs mark most of the alignment of the road.

Major north–south routes include:
  Highway 133 runs north from Interstate 44 exit 145 about two miles east of Hazelgreen to Richland, Swedeborg, Crocker, and about two miles west of Dixon, then north out of the county.
  Highway 7 runs north from Interstate 44 exit 150 about three miles west of Buckhorn to Richland, then north out of the county toward the Lake of the Ozarks region.
  Highway 17 crosses Interstate 44 at exit 153 at Buckhorn, runs east through Waynesville, turns north to Crocker, and then runs north out of the county to Iberia. South of Interstate 44, Highway 17 hugs the western edge of Fort Leonard Wood, passes near Laquey, and circles south of the post until it runs out of the county and eventually joins Highway 32 in Roby.
  Missouri T runs north from Highway 17 at Waynesville to Swedeborg, where it meets and ends at Highway 133 about halfway between Richland and Crocker.
  Highway 28 crosses Interstate 44 at exit 163 at the eastern edge of St. Robert, runs north through Dixon, and then runs north out of the county.
 A secondary road parallels Highway 28, beginning as Missouri Y at exit 161 of Interstate 44 in St. Robert, running north to the Gasconade River bridge where it becomes the county-maintained Cave Road and turning north as Highway O until it meets Highway 28 a few miles south of Dixon.

Major attractions along U.S. Route 66 include the Old Stagecoach Stop in downtown Waynesville, which is now a museum but began as a tavern and boarding house and is the oldest standing structure in the county. It was used as a Civil War hospital for Union troops who were garrisoned above the city in Fort Wayne, which was demolished after the war. The Old Courthouse Museum in downtown Waynesville is near the Old Stagecoach Stop. The third Pulaski County courthouse was struck by lightning on June 3, 1903, and destroyed. Three bridges cross the Big Piney River at Devil's Elbow - the modern Interstate 44 bridge, the later U.S. Route 66 alignment on Highway Z that was made possible by the Hooker Cut through a steep hillside, and the original U.S. Route 66 alignment on Teardrop Road that includes a historic bridge that is in the process of renovation. The Elbow Inn is a biker bar that is a frequent stop on the original U.S. Route 66 alignment.

Politics

Local

Politics at the local level in Pulaski County were traditionally dominated by the Democratic Party, but Republican Party candidates have become increasingly viable in the years since 2002, when the first large-scale victories of Republican candidates began. That's generally attributed to the increasing number of military personnel who retire in the area and switch their voter registration to Pulaski County.

In 2002, Republicans Diana Linnenbringer, Dennis Thornsberry and Barbara Shackelford (now Barbara Thomas) were elected to the offices of county clerk, western district county commissioner, and county treasurer, defeating Democrats in those offices.

The trend continued in 2004 when Republican Bill Farnham defeated the Democratic incumbent, Eastern District County Commissioner Gary Carmack, and Republicans Don Mayhew and Loretta Rouse defeated two long-term Democratic incumbents, County Surveyor John Mackey and County Public Administrator Paula Long Weber. In state offices, Democratic State Rep. Bill Ransdall, who was term-limited and could not run for re-election, was replaced by Republican David Day who defeated the Democratic candidate, Clara Ichord, in what turned out to be a landslide victory for Day.

In 2006, the incumbent Democratic Presiding Commissioner, Tony Crismon, switched parties but was defeated in the Republican primary by Tim Berrier, who was subsequently defeated in the general election by Bill Ransdall. That year also saw a switch in party affiliation in the collector's office, where the longtime Democratic incumbent retired and was replaced by Republican Terri Mitchell, whose husband, Jim Mitchell, had preceded Ransdall in Pulaski County's state house seat.  Kyle Bomar of Crocker challenged David Day, Day was reelected to the Missouri House with over 65% of the vote.

The 2008 Democratic victories nationally had minimal effect on Pulaski County party affiliations, with retiring Republican Western District County Commissioner Dennis Thornsberry being replaced by another Republican, Ricky Zweerink; the only party affiliation switch was in the county surveyor's office where Mackey recovered his seat for the Democrats after defeating Mayhew. David Day was unopposed.

Two resignations occurred in 2009; County Treasurer Barbara Thomas resigned and Presiding Commissioner Bill Ransdall accepted an appointment by Gov. Jay Nixon to the Missouri State Tax Commission, which required him to resign county offices and numerous other positions. Nixon appointed Democrat Morris Roam to fill Thomas' Republican seat and appointed Democrat Don McCulloch, the retired Waynesville Police Chief, to fill Ransdall's seat.

In the 2010 elections, Roam chose not to run and was replaced by Republican Sue Rapone, who defeated the Democratic nominee, Ted Helms. Rep. David Day was again unopposed and entered his last term in the Missouri House of Representatives due to term limits.  McCulloch was defeated by St. Robert Alderman Gene Newkirk, a Republican. Diana Linnenbringer retired and was replaced by fellow Republican Brent Bassett; no Democrats ran in their party's primary. Incumbent Democrat Circuit Court Clerk Rachelle Beasley was the only member of her party to win re-election for county office; incumbent Republican Collector Terri Mitchell had no opposition in either the primary or the general election. The prosecutor's office did not change parties, but incumbent Deborah Hooper was defeated in the Republican primary in a three-way contest, coming in third behind St. Robert City Attorney Kevin Hillman, the victor, and criminal defense attorney Jeff Thomas. Hillman went on to defeat the Democratic nominee, Wayne Gifford, in the general election.

In the 2012 elections, Democrat John Mackey chose not to run for re-election as county surveyor and was replaced by former surveyor Don Mayhew, a Republican who ran unopposed. Republican Sheriff JB King decided not to run for re-election and his position became the most heavily contested race in the county, with former sheriff JT Roberts losing the Democratic primary to Bill Anderson, who then lost in the general election to Republican candidate Ron Long, who had previously defeated Republican challengers Nick Pappas and Johnny Burgess. Incumbent Republican Ricky Zweerink was re-elected as Western District Commissioner while incumbent Republican Bill Farnham was defeated in a three-way primary race between himself, former county treasurer Barb Shackleford, and victor Lynn Sharp. County Assessor Roger Harrison was re-elected in the November election but died in an accident on his farm before taking office; his deputy, fellow Democrat Kim Skaggs-Henson,  was appointed by Gov. Jay Nixon to fill the vacancy.

In the 2014 elections, most county officeholders remained unchanged except for the assessor's position, in which Democrat Kim Skaggs-Henson ran for election to the remainder of the term for which she had been appointed. She was defeated in that race by Republican Dan Whittle.

The Republican Party mostly controls politics at the local level in Pulaski County. Republicans hold all but two of the elected non-judicial positions in the county. Rachelle Beasley was re-elected as the circuit clerk and recorder of deeds. The other Democrat, County Coroner Mikel Hartness, did not face a challenge in his 2012 re-election race. He did not run for re-election in 2016 and was replaced by Republican Gary Carmack.

State

Pulaski County is divided between three districts in the Missouri House of Representatives, all of which are held by Republicans.
District 121 — Don Mayhew (R- Crocker). Consists of Crocker, Dixon, and Richland.

District 122 — Steve Lynch (R- Waynesville). Consists of the northern part of Fort Leonard Wood and the communities of St. Robert and Waynesville.

District 142 — Robert Ross (R- Yukon). Consists of the southern part of Fort Leonard Wood and the unincorporated community of Devils Elbow.

All of Pulaski County is a part of Missouri's 16th District in the Missouri Senate and is represented by Dan Brown (R- Rolla).

Federal

All of Pulaski County is included in Missouri's 4th Congressional District and is represented by Vicky Hartzler (R-Harrisonville) in the U.S. House of Representatives.

Missouri presidential preference primary (2008)

Former U.S. Senator Hillary Clinton (D-New York) received more votes, a total of 1,385, than any candidate from either party in Pulaski County during the 2008 presidential primary.

Media
KFBD-FM and its AM sister station, KJPW, are the dominant news radio providers in the Pulaski County area, which includes Fort Leonard Wood, Waynesville, and St. Robert. These stations compete with the only other station broadcasting from Pulaski County, KFLW Radio, owned by the Lebanon Daily Record and working locally from the St. Robert offices of the Pulaski County Mirror, the weekly newspaper.

The weekly Dixon Pilot is privately owned by a former Dixon resident who now lives in Rolla.
The Pulaski County Daily News internet newspaper is privately owned by a Waynesville resident.
Allen Hilliard Sports internet sports website is privately owned by a St Robert resident.

Education
School districts include:

K-12:
 Crocker R-II School District
 Dixon R-I School District
 Laquey R-V School District
 Newburg R-II School District
 Plato R-V School District
 Richland R-IV School District
 Waynesville R-VI Schools

Elementary only:
 Gasconade C-4 School District
 Phelps County R-III School District
 Swedeborg R-III School District

School district details

Fort Leonard Wood is in Pulaski County and a high percentage of military personnel live off post in surrounding communities, especially St. Robert and Waynesville but also the farther-out cities of Richland, Crocker, and Dixon, and the unincorporated communities of Laquey, Swedeborg and Devil's Elbow, all of which have a lower housing cost than nearer housing in St. Robert and Waynesville. Military personnel assigned to training areas on the south end of the post sometimes choose to live in the unincorporated areas of Big Piney and Palace in Pulaski County, or the northern Texas County communities of Plato and Roby.

Seven main school districts are fully or partly within the borders of Pulaski County, not counting two small districts which are mostly within other counties and only have only a few dozen residents within Pulaski County. All seven school districts have a high percentage of Fort Leonard Wood military dependents, and over two-thirds of Waynesville students fall into that category.

The cities of Waynesville and St. Robert and the Fort Leonard Wood army installation, along with their surrounding rural areas running east to Devil's Elbow, are served by the Waynesville R-VI School District which is by far the largest in the county.

The cities of Richland, Crocker, and Dixon, along with their surrounding rural areas, are served by the Richland R-IV School District, the Crocker R-II School District and the Dixon R-I School District. The Richland and Dixon districts both extend into rural parts of adjacent counties.

The unincorporated communities of Laquey and Swedeborg are served by the Laquey R-V School District and the Swedeborg R-III School District. Swedeborg is the county's last remaining K-8 district and most of its high school students attend Richland High School though some attend Crocker High School or Waynesville High School; all other districts serve students running from kindergarten through high school.

The areas south of Fort Leonard Wood, including the unincorporated Pulaski County communities of Big Piney and Palace, is served by the Plato R-V School District, which is based in the northern Texas County village of Plato but also includes parts of Pulaski, Laclede and Wright counties.

Public schools
Crocker R-II School District – Crocker
Crocker Elementary School (PK-06) 
Crocker High School (07-12)
Dixon R-I School District – Dixon
Dixon Elementary School (PK-05) 
Dixon Middle School (06-08) 
Dixon High School (09-12)
Laquey R-V School District – Laquey
Laquey Elementary School (PK-05) 
Laquey Middle School (06-08) 
Laquey High School (09-12)
Swedeborg R-VIII School District – Swedeborg
Swedeborg Elementary School (PK-08)
Richland R-IV School District – Richland 
Richland Elementary School (K-06) 
Richland Junior High School (07-08) 
Richland High School (09-12)
Waynesville R-VI School District – Waynesville
Williams Early Childhood Center (PK) – Ft. Leonard Wood 
East Elementary School (K-05) - Waynesville
Freedom Elementary School (K-05) – St. Robert
Partridge Elementary School (K-05) – Ft. Leonard Wood 
Thayer Elementary School (K-05) – Ft. Leonard Wood
Wood Elementary School (K-05) – Ft. Leonard Wood 
Waynesville Sixth Grade Center (06) — Waynesville
Waynesville Middle School (07-08) — Waynesville
Waynesville High School (09-12) — Waynesville

Private schools
Maranatha Baptist Academy – St. Robert (K4-12) – Baptist

Public libraries
Pulaski County Library

Communities

Cities
Crocker
Dixon
Richland (small parts in Camden and Laclede counties)
St. Robert
Waynesville (county seat)

Census-designated place
Fort Leonard Wood

Unincorporated places

Big Piney 
Buckhorn 
 Cookville
Devils Elbow 
Franks
Gascozark 
Hancock
Hawkeye
Helm
 Hooker
Laquey 
Palace
St. John
Shady Grove
Swedeborg
Uranus

See also
National Register of Historic Places listings in Pulaski County, Missouri

References

Further reading
 History of Laclede, Camden, Dallas, Webster, Wright, Texas, Pulaski, Phelps, and Dent counties, Missouri (1889) full text

External links
 Digitized 1930 Plat Book of Pulaski County  from l Division of Special Collections, Archives, and Rare Books

 
1833 establishments in Missouri
Populated places established in 1833